Kim Dae-woo (born December 2, 2000) is a South Korean professional football midfielder playing for Gangwon FC of the K League 1.

Career statistics

Club

References

External links
 

2000 births
Living people
South Korean footballers
K League 1 players
Gangwon FC players
Association football midfielders